Dříteč is a municipality and village in Pardubice District in the Pardubice Region of the Czech Republic. It has about 600 inhabitants.

History

The first written mention of Dříteč is from 1229.

Sights
The main landmark is the Church of Saints Peter and Paul. It is a Gothic building from 1336.

References

External links

Villages in Pardubice District